Ernest McNeil Moore (born June 26, 1933) is a former American football player who played for Chicago Bears of the National Football League (NFL). He played college football at Sam Houston State University and Rice University.

References

1933 births
Living people
American football defensive backs
Chicago Bears players
Rice Owls football players
Sam Houston Bearkats football players
Players of American football from Texas